De La Fratta, also known as Cesta, is one of three towered peaks overlooking the city of San Marino, the capital of San Marino. The other two are Guaita and Montale.

Overview
The tower  is located on the highest of Monte Titano's summits. A museum to honor Saint Marinus, created in 1956, is located in this tower and showcases over 1,550 weapons dating from the medieval era to the modern day. The tower is an important part of Sammarinese history, and was constructed in the 13th century on the remains of an older Roman fort.

It is one of the three towers depicted on both the national flag and coat of arms.

References

See also
Guaita (1st tower)
Montale (3rd tower)
Three Towers of San Marino
City of San Marino
Sammarinese Museum of Ancient Arms
 

Mountains of San Marino
Buildings and structures in the City of San Marino
Towers in San Marino